The Zabriskie House, also known as the Hohokus Inn, is located in Ho-Ho-Kus, Bergen County, New Jersey, United States. The house was added to the National Register of Historic Places on January 10, 1983.

History
The home was built in 1796 by Andrew Zabriskie as a home for his son John Zabriskie. The home was later used as a parsonage. In 1890 the home was converted into a tavern. The borough of Ho-Ho-Kus purchased the home in 1941 and began leasing the home as a restaurant in 1953.

Ho-Ho-Kus Inn

The Ho-Ho-Kus Inn is a restaurant that is operated within the Zabriskie House.

See also 
 National Register of Historic Places listings in Bergen County, New Jersey

References

Ho-Ho-Kus, New Jersey
Houses completed in 1796
Houses on the National Register of Historic Places in New Jersey
Houses in Bergen County, New Jersey
National Register of Historic Places in Bergen County, New Jersey
New Jersey Register of Historic Places
1796 establishments in New Jersey